Massachusetts has an estimated population of 6.893 million as of 2019 according to the U. S. Census Bureau. This represents a 5.4% increase in population from 2010, when the population was 6.547 million. Currently, Massachusetts is the fifteenth most populous U.S. state.

Massachusetts has seen both population increases and decreases in recent years. For example, while some Bay Staters are leaving, others are moving there including European, Asian, Hispanic, African, Middle Eastern, and North American immigrants. Massachusetts in 2004 included 881,400 foreign-born residents.

Most Bay Staters live within a 60-mile radius of the State House on Beacon Hill, often called Greater Boston: the City of Boston, neighboring cities and towns, the North Shore, South Shore, the northern, western, and southern suburbs, and most of southeastern and central Massachusetts. Eastern Massachusetts is more urban than Western Massachusetts, which is primarily rural, save for the cities of Springfield, Chicopee, Holyoke, and Northampton, which serve as centers of population density in the Pioneer Valley of the Connecticut River. The center of population of Massachusetts is located in Middlesex County, in the town of Natick.

Population

Structure 
The following demographic statistics are taken from the U.S. Census Bureau's 2019 ACS 1-year estimates.

The total population is 7,029,917. The median age is 39.7 years (38.0 for males, 41.1 for females). There are 5,540,726 people 18 years or older.

The population is distributed as follows:
 Under 5 years: 5.2%
 5–9 years: 5.2%
 10–14 years: 5.7%
 15–19 years: 6.5%
 20–24 years: 7.0%
 25–29 years: 7.3%
 30–34 years: 7.1%
 35–39 years: 6.4%
 40–44 years: 6.0%
 45–49 years: 6.2%
 50–54 years: 6.8%
 55–59 years: 7.0%
 60–64 years: 6.6%
 65–69 years: 5.4%
 70–74 years: 4.4%
 75–79 years: 3.0%
 80–84 years: 1.9%
 Over 85 years: 2.3%

The total sex ratio of Massachusetts is 94.3 male/100 female. For ages 18 years and over, the sex ratio is 92.0 male/100 female and for ages 65 years and over, the sex ratio is 76.9 male/100 female.

Birth rate 

 51.2 births/1,000 females ages 15–44 (2017 est.)

Death rate 

 675.7 deaths/100,000 people (2017 est.)

Life expectancy 
 80.6 years at birth in 2017

Density 
Massachusetts has a density of 890 people per square mile, making it the third most dense of the fifty states (fifth including District of Columbia and Puerto Rico).

Ancestry

According to the 2015-2019 American Community Survey 5-Year Estimates, the largest ancestry groups in Massachusetts are:

Massachusetts is the second-most Irish state in the country (after New Hampshire) and the fourth-most Italian state in the country (after Connecticut, Rhode Island, and New Jersey) in percentage of total population. Irish Americans are mostly concentrated in the eastern and southeastern parts of the state; the South Shore region has an Irish population above 40% (giving it the nickname of the "Irish Riviera"). Massachusetts has the most Moroccans, Brazilians, and Ugandans of state in the country in percentage of total population. Massachusetts also has large communities of people of Finnish, Swedish, Norwegian, Danish and Icelandic descent; Armenian, Lebanese, Turkish, and Syrian descent; and Italian and Spanish descent. Other influential ethnicities are Greek Americans, Lithuanian Americans, Polish Americans and German Americans. Massachusetts "Yankees," of colonial English ancestry, still have a strong presence. French Canadian Americans form a significant part of the population in central and western Massachusetts, while Polish Americans are prevalent in the Springfield area and English Americans are common in the rural areas of western Massachusetts.

Boston's largest immigrant groups are from Haiti, the Dominican Republic, and China. In the northeast of the state, is home to a large Cambodian (Khmer) community, second in the country only to the concentration of Cambodians in Long Beach, California. Massachusetts also has the fastest growing population of South Asians, including Indian people, which are concentrated in certain areas of Greater Boston and outside such as Shrewsbury, Woburn, Malden, Quincy, Somerville, and Cambridge. Most of them have emigrated to work in health professional settings, business, engineering, IT/computer science industries, and finance. There is a flux of Indians emigrating to pursue higher studies education.

Massachusetts has one of the largest lusophone populations in North America. It has the largest Cape Verdean population and the second-largest Portuguese population (after California) of any state in the United States, and as a percentage of population is second to only Rhode Island for both ethnic groups. Fall River and New Bedford on the south coast have large populations of Portuguese, Brazilian, and Cape Verdean heritage, all of which are also prevalent in the Taunton and Brockton areas. There is a growing Brazilian population in the Boston area (especially in Framingham).

Although many of the Native Americans have intermarried with other ethnic groups (or died in King Philip's War of 1675), the Wampanoag tribe maintains reservations at Aquinnah, at Grafton, on Martha's Vineyard, and at Mashpee on Cape Cod. The Nipmuck maintain two state-recognized reservations in the central part of the state. Many Wampanoags and other native people live outside of reservations.

Birth data
Note: Births in table don't add up, because Hispanics are counted both by their ethnicity and by their race, giving a higher overall number.

Since 2016, data for births of White Hispanic origin are not collected, but included in one Hispanic group; persons of Hispanic origin may be of any race.

Languages
The most common form of American English spoken in Massachusetts, other than General American English, are the New England accent and the Boston accent.

As of 2010, 78.93% (4,823,127) of Massachusetts residents age 5 and older spoke English at home as a primary language, while 7.50% (458,256) spoke Spanish, 2.97% (181,437) Portuguese, 1.59% (96,690) Chinese (which includes Cantonese and Mandarin), 1.11% (67,788) French, 0.89% (54,456) French Creole, 0.72% (43,798) Italian, 0.62% (37,865) Russian, and Vietnamese was spoken as a main language by 0.58% (35,283) of the population over the age of five. In total, 21.07% (1,287,419) of Massachusetts's population age 5 and older spoke a mother language other than English.

Religion

As the United States does not collect religious data, it is unknown how many people of each religion live in Massachusetts.  Some polls only measure religious adherence of church rather than the whole population. Massachusetts was founded and settled by Puritans in the 17th century. The descendants of the Puritans belong to many different churches; in the direct line of inheritance are the Congregational/United Church of Christ and Unitarian Universalist Association. Both of these denominations are noted for their strong support of social justice, civil rights, and moral issues, including strong and early advocacy of abolition of slavery, women's rights, and (after 2000) legal recognition of same-sex marriage.  The headquarters of the Unitarian Universalist Association is located on Beacon Hill in Boston.  Today Protestants make up less than 1/4 of the state's population. Roman Catholics now predominate because of massive immigration from Ireland, Quebec, Italy, Poland, Portugal, Puerto Rico, the Dominican Republic, Brazil, and Mexico. A large Jewish population came to the Boston area between 1880 and 1920. Many Jews from Eastern Europe have also been immigrating to the Boston area since the fall of the Soviet Union. Islam has also been growing in recent years due to immigration and conversion and now numbers between 30,000 and 80,000. Mary Baker Eddy made the Boston Mother Church of Christian Science the world headquarters. Buddhists, Taoists, Confucianists, Pagans, Hindus, Sikhs, Seventh-day Adventists, Mormons, and Jehovah’s Witnesses also can be found. Kripalu and the Insight Meditation Center (Barre) are examples of non-western religious centers in Massachusetts. Bahá'ís are also present.

According to the Association of Religion Data Archives the largest single denominations are the Roman Catholic Church with 3,092,296; the United Church of Christ with 121,826; and the Episcopal Church with 98,963 adherents. Jewish congregations had about 275,000 members. In 2020, the Public Religion Research Institute determined 67% of the population of Massachusetts were Christian, and 23% of the population identified as irreligious.

, the religious affiliations of the people of Massachusetts, according to Pew Research Center were:

Migration

The latest (2009) estimated Census population figures show that Massachusetts has grown by over 3 percent, to 6,593,587 since 2000. This slow growth is likely attributable to the fact that Massachusetts continues to attract top scholars and researchers from across the United States as well as large numbers of immigrants, combined with steady emigration away from the state towards New Hampshire and southern and western regions of the U.S. because of high housing costs, weather, and traffic.

Recent census data shows that the number of immigrants living in Massachusetts has increased over 5% from 2000–2005. The biggest influxes are Latin Americans. According to the census, the population of Central Americans rose by 67.7 percent between 2000 and 2005, and the number of South Americans rose by 107.5 percent. And among South Americans, the largest group to increase appeared to be Brazilians, whose numbers rose by 131.4 percent, to 84,836. This surge of immigrants tends to offset emigration, and, of course, given the 350,000 increase in population in the Commonwealth between 1990 and 2000, many immigrants to Massachusetts come from elsewhere in the USA.

Following the shift to a high-tech economy and the numerous factory closures, few jobs remain for low skilled male workers, who are dropping out of the workforce in large numbers. The percentage of men in the labor force fell from 77.7% in 1989 to 72.8% in 2005. This national trend is most pronounced in Massachusetts. In the case of men without high school diplomas, 10% have left the labor force between 1990 and 2000.

References

External links
 "Blacks' arrival in Massachusetts" (Archive). WGBH-TV. February 26, 1988.
 "Violence against Asian immigrants" (Archive). WGBH-TV. November 19, 1987.

 
Geography of Massachusetts
Mass